Jeff Mauro (born July 24, 1978) is the co-host of the Food Network series The Kitchen and host of Sandwich King and $24 in 24. Prior to this, he was the winner of the seventh season of the Food Network Star competition. Mauro, who is originally from Elmwood Park, Illinois, incorporates local Chicago restaurants into the context of his show.

During Food Network Star, where fifteen contestants competed for an opportunity to have their own cooking show, Mauro maintained a strict concentration on sandwiches throughout the competition. The judges on the show noted Mauro's humor and likable persona, which are focal points of his personality on Sandwich King.

Mauro rejected criticisms that there wasn't enough to say about sandwiches to fill out a season, noting that any handheld "meal" could be classified as a sandwich. In 2012, Mauro was nominated for a Daytime Emmy award for his show Sandwich King on the Food Network Channel. The award eventually went to Bobby Flay for his show Bobby Flay's Barbecue Addiction.

In January 2014, Mauro became a co-host on the Food Network series The Kitchen along with Sunny Anderson, Katie Lee, Marcela Valladolid and Geoffrey Zakarian.

Mauro graduated from Bradley University in Peoria, Illinois, in 2000, where he studied radio and television.  Jeff Mauro is also a Sigma Chi.

In 2017, Jeff began appearing in ads for Subway restaurants.

In January, 2021 he began hosting Kitchen Crash on Food Network, an update of Gordon Elliott's Door Knock Dinners. Season two starts July 12, 2022.

In 2022, Mauro co-hosted Season 24 of Worst Cooks in America, coaching a team of 1990’s celebrities against a team led by fellow co-host Anne Burrell, who won the contest with her "recruit" Tracey Gold.

References

External links 
 

1978 births
Living people
American television chefs
American male chefs
Bradley University alumni
Food Network chefs
Food Network Star winners
People from Chicago
People from Elmwood Park, Illinois